This is a list of diplomatic missions of Estonia. Estonia reestablished a foreign ministry on 12 April 1990, while the country was slowly restoring independence from the Soviet Union, with the symbols and instruments of sovereignty progressively being reintroduced. The events in August the following year when a coup attempt failed in Moscow accelerated the progress towards independence. The staff of the ministry worked a seven-day work week with threadbare facilities and supplies until January 1992, after they had secured Estonia's international recognition, and opened missions in New York City, Helsinki, Stockholm, Copenhagen, Bonn, Paris, and Moscow.

The Estonian government considers Estonia's incorporation into the Soviet Union illegal, and the foreign ministry to have been in continual operation since 1918.

Estonia and the other Baltic states, together with the Nordic countries have signed a memorandum of understanding on the posting of diplomats at each other's missions abroad, under the auspices of Nordic-Baltic Eight.

Total of Estonia embassies locations: 41

Africa

 Cairo (Embassy)

Americas

 Ottawa (Embassy)

 Washington, D.C. (Embassy)
 New York (Consulate-General)
 San Francisco (Consulate-General)

Asia

 Baku (Embassy office)

 Beijing (Embassy)

 Tbilisi (Embassy)

 New Delhi (Embassy)

 Tel Aviv (Embassy)

 Tokyo (Embassy)

 Astana (Embassy)

 Singapore (Embassy)

 Seoul (Embassy)

 Ankara (Embassy)

 Abu Dhabi (Embassy)

Europe

 Vienna (Embassy)

 Minsk (Embassy)

 Brussels (Embassy)

 Prague (Embassy)

 Copenhagen (Embassy)

 Helsinki (Embassy)

 Paris (Embassy)

 Berlin (Embassy)

 Athens (Embassy)

 Budapest (Embassy)

 Dublin (Embassy)

 Rome (Embassy)

 Riga (Embassy)

 Vilnius (Embassy)

 Chișinău (Embassy office)

 The Hague (Embassy)

 Oslo (Embassy)

 Warsaw (Embassy)

 Lisbon (Embassy)

 Bucharest (Embassy)

 Moscow (Embassy)

 Madrid (Embassy)

 Stockholm (Embassy)

 Kyiv (Embassy)

 London (Embassy)

Oceania

 Canberra (Embassy)

Multilateral organisations
 Brussels
permanent representation to NATO
permanent representation to the European Union
 Geneva
permanent representation to the United Nations Headquarters and Other International Organisations
 Nairobi
office of the permanent representation, accredited to the United Nations Environment Organization
New York City
permanent representation to the United Nations
 Paris
permanent representation to Organisation for Economic Co-operation and Development
 Strasbourg
permanent representation to the Council of Europe
Vienna 
permanent representation to the Organization for Security and Co-operation in Europe

Gallery

See also
Foreign relations of Estonia
List of diplomatic missions in Estonia

References
 Foreign Ministry of Estonia

 
Estonia
Diplomatic missions

no:Estlands diplomati